Cyrtopholis is a genus of tarantulas that was first described by Eugène Louis Simon in 1892.

Diagnosis 
This genus can be distinguished by being found in the Caribbean, and by the presence of claviform stridulatory hairs on the trochanter of the pedipalps and the legs I. They also own type 1 and 3 urticating hairs on the abdomen. The spermatheca of females is formed by 2 long receptacles with no fusion at the base.

Species
 it contains twenty-two species, found in the Caribbean and South America:
 Cyrtopholis agilis Pocock, 1903 - Hispaniola
 Cyrtopholis anacanta Franganillo, 1935 - Cuba
 Cyrtopholis annectans Chamberlin, 1917 - Barbados
 Cyrtopholis bartholomaei (Latreille, 1832) - St. Thomas, Antigua
 Cyrtopholis bonhotei (F. O. Pickard-Cambridge, 1901) - Bahama Is.
 Cyrtopholis bryantae Rudloff, 1995 - Cuba
 Cyrtopholis culebrae (Petrunkevitch, 1929) - Puerto Rico
 Cyrtopholis cursor (Ausserer, 1875) (type) - Hispaniola
 Cyrtopholis femoralis Pocock, 1903 - Montserrat
 Cyrtopholis flavostriata Schmidt, 1995 - Virgin Is.
 Cyrtopholis gibbosa Franganillo, 1936 - Cuba
 Cyrtopholis innocua (Ausserer, 1871) - Cuba
 Cyrtopholis intermedia (Ausserer, 1875) - South America
 Cyrtopholis ischnoculiformis (Franganillo, 1926) - Cuba
 Cyrtopholis jamaicola Strand, 1908 - Jamaica
 Cyrtopholis major (Franganillo, 1926) - Cuba
 Cyrtopholis obsoleta (Franganillo, 1935) - Cuba
 Cyrtopholis plumosa Franganillo, 1931 - Cuba
 Cyrtopholis portoricae Chamberlin, 1917 - Puerto Rico
 Cyrtopholis ramsi Rudloff, 1995 - Cuba
 Cyrtopholis regibbosa Rudloff, 1994 - Cuba
 Cyrtopholis unispina Franganillo, 1926 - Cuba

In synonymy
C. debilis Franganillo, 1931 = Cyrtopholis unispina 
C. debilis Franganillo, 1931 = Cyrtopholis major

Nomen dubium
Cyrtopholis meridionalis (Keyserling, 1891) - Brazil

Nomen nudum
Cyrtopholis respina Franganillo, 1935 - Cuba

Transferred to other genera

 C. angustata Kraus, 1955 → Stichoplastoris angustatus
 C. cyanea Rudloff, 1994 → Citharacanthus cyaneus
 C. longistyla Kraus, 1955 →  Stichoplastoris longistylus
 C. lycosoides Tullgren, 1905 → Acanthoscurria theraphosoides
 C. media Chamberlin, 1917 → Nesipelma medium
 C. palmarum Schiapelli & Gerschman, 1945 → Umbyquyra palmarum
 C. pernix (Ausserer, 1875) → Hemirrhagus pernix
 C. sargi Strand, 1907 → Citharacanthus sargi (Nomen dubium)
 C. schmidti Rudloff, 1996 → Umbyquyra schmidti
 C. schusterae Kraus, 1955 → Stichoplastoris schusterae
 C. zorodes Mello-Leitão, 1923 → Acanthoscurria gomesiana

See also
 List of Theraphosidae species

References

Theraphosidae genera
Spiders of South America
Spiders of the Caribbean
Theraphosidae